McKernon may refer to:

Craig McKernon (born 1968), British footballer
Jamie McKernon (born 1992), British footballer